Lucie Eddie Campbell (Lucie Eddie Campbell-Williams; April 30, 1885 – January 3, 1963) was an American composer and singer of hymns, as well as an educator and advocate for social justice.

Background 
Lucie Eddie Campbell, the youngest of nine children, was born to Burrell and Isabella (Wilkerson) Campbell in Duck Hill, Mississippi. Burrell Campbell worked for the Mississippi Central Railroad (later purchased by the Illinois Central Railroad), and Isabella worked as a cook. Shortly after Lucie's birth, Burrell Campbell was killed in a train accident. Being the sole provider for and caretaker of her nine children, Isabella moved to Memphis, Tennessee.

Isabella Campbell not only wanted her children to receive an education, she also wanted them exposed to the performing arts. She elected to give piano lessons to Lora, Lucie's older sister. While piano lessons were being given to Lora, Lucie listened attentively and practiced the lessons on her own.

Education
Campbell was educated in the public schools of Memphis. In 1899, she was graduated from Kortrecht High School (later Booker T. Washington) as valedictorian of her class and was awarded the highest prize for her Latin proficiency. After completing high school, She passed the teachers' exam and began her teaching career at Ces Avenue Grammar School. In 1911, she was transferred to Kortrecht High School, where she taught American history and English. Later, she earned the baccalaureate degree from Rust College in Holy Springs, Mississippi, and the master's degree from Tennessee Agricultural and Industrial State College.

Career as an educator, evangelist, songwriter and activist
At age nineteen, Campbell organized a group of Beale Street musicians into the Music Club. Other members later were added to form a thousand-voice choir that performed at the National Baptist Convention. At the organizational meeting of the National Sunday and Baptist Training Union Congress held in Memphis in 1915, "Miss Lucie" was elected as music director. She penned songs for the Congress and wrote musical pageants exhorting the young to give their lives to Christian service. In addition to writing religious music for the Congress, she also wrote the Congress' study lessons, as well as other instructional materials. Campbell could be found singing and preaching at revival meeting in local Baptist churches that welcomed her.

In 1919, Campbell published her first song, "Something Within", which was followed by more than one hundred others, including "The Lord is My Shepherd", "Heavenly Sunshine", "The King's Highway", "Touch Me Lord Jesus", "He Understands" and "He'll Say Well Done". The core of "He'll Say Well Done", written in 1933, was covered as "End of My Journey" by various artists over the decades, including The Rebels with Jim Hamill, Hank Snow, Johnny Cash, The Famous Davis Sisters of Philadelphia, Delores "Mom" Winans, Ferlin Husky, the duet of Donald Vails and Debbie Steele Hayden, and Ernest Tubb, among many others.

Campbell also introduced promising young musicians such as Marian Anderson and J. Robert Bradley to the world. "Miss Lucie" introduced Anderson to the National Baptist Convention and served as her accompanist. In 1955, Campbell's loyalty and dedication to the Baptist Sunday School and Baptist Training Union Congress was recognized when she was named as one of the principal lecturers during the 50th Anniversary Session held in Atlantic City, New Jersey.

In 1946, she was named to the National Policy Planning Commission of the National Education Association. She was elected vice president of the American Teachers Association and from 1941 to 1946 she served as president of the Tennessee Teachers Association. She was also the music director of the National Baptist Convention's Sunday School and the Union Congress of the Baptist Young People.

Campbell was an activist for civil justice. She defied the Jim Crow streetcar laws when she refused to relinquish her seat in the section reserved for whites, and as president of the Negro Education Association, she struggled with governmental officials to redress the inequities in the pay scale and other benefits for Negro teachers.

Marriage and death
On January 14, 1960, Campbell married her lifelong companion, the Reverend C. R. Williams. The marriage ceremony took place in the home of Mr. and Mrs. Zack Brown in Memphis. As an expression of her love and respect for her friend, business partner, and companion, Campbell-Williams dedicated her song, "They That Wait Upon the Lord", to her husband.

The National Sunday School and the Baptist Training Union Congress of the National Baptist Convention showed its appreciation to its "first lady of music" when it declared June 20, 1962, as Lucie E. Campbell Appreciation Day. While preparing to attend the celebration and banquet held in her honor, Campbell-Williams suddenly became gravely ill and was rushed to a hospital.

After a six-month bout with illness, Campbell-Williams died on January 3, 1963, in Nashville. Her body was conveyed to Memphis and funeral services were held on January 7 at the Mount Nebo Baptist Church by pastor Dr. Roy Love. She was interred in the Mount Carmel Cemetery.

Notes

References
George, Luvenia (1987) "Lucie E. Campbell: Baptist Composer and Educator," Black Perspective in Music 15 (Spring): 24–49.

Tennessee Encyclopedia
Gather.com
Blogspot.com

1885 births
1963 deaths
American composers
Composers of Christian music
People from Duck Hill, Mississippi
Rust College alumni
Songwriters from Mississippi
20th-century American women musicians
20th-century American musicians
American women hymnwriters